The Continental may refer to:

 The Continental (1952 TV series), a 1952–53 television series on CBS
 The Continental (miniseries), an upcoming television series on Peacock
 "The Continental" (Saturday Night Live), a recurring sketch on the NBC program
 "The Continental" (song), a popular song and winner of the first Academy Award for Best Song in 1934
 The Continental, a 1987 film directed by John Godber and Martin Shardlow
 The Continental (U.S. Supreme Court case), a U.S. Supreme Court case of 1872; see volume # 81, case # 345
 "The Continental", a song by Prince from the Love Symbol Album
 The Continental, a fictional hotel in the John Wick franchise
 Hook Continental, a passenger train running between London's Liverpool Street Station and Harwich Parkestone Quay

See also 
 Continental (disambiguation)
 Hotel Continental (disambiguation)